Patrick Thomas Curran  (12 December 1908 – 26 June 1985) was a New Zealand trade unionist and local-body politician.

Biography

Early life and career
Curran was born in Ashburton in 1908 to Maurice Curran and Elizabeth Trevathan. He was a motoring enthusiast and together with his brother David, he established a motor dealership in Ashburton. Curran then married Phyllis and moved to Auckland shortly before World War II, David likewise moved to Auckland in 1946.

He also had a pilot's license and in 1940 enlisted in the Air Force during World War II and he served in the Pacific. In 1945 he was Mentioned in dispatches and awarded the Bronze Star Medal.

Political career
Curran was a sympathizer of John A. Lee and joined the Democratic Labour Party (DLP). In the  he stood as the DLP candidate for the Auckland West, placing third out of four candidates. Curran later left the DLP and joined the Labour Party.

In 1947 he stood unsuccessfully for the Auckland City Council in a contest which saw all Labour candidates defeated. He stood on the Labour ticket again in 1953 and was successful, and was re-elected in 1956. During his time on the council he was chairman of the traffic committee and oversaw the introduction of Traffic lights to Auckland. In 1958 he introduced the Barnes Dance system of pedestrian crossing to solve intersection blockages, the first in New Zealand was situated Queen Street.

In May 1959 he was injured in a three-car accident near Sanson in which three people were killed. One of the others injured was Western Maori MP Iriaka Rātana. He and the others injured in the crash were taken to Palmerston North Hospital. He was treated for head injuries and fractured ribs but did not receive any serious injuries and recovered soon after.

He stood for the mayoralty in a 1957 by-election as an independent, but polled poorly receiving only 3.35 percent of the vote. He did not stand for the council in 1959, but stood again one final time in 1965 as an independent, but was unsuccessful.

Later life and death
Curran died at his home in Saint Heliers in 1985, survived by his wife and three children.

Notes

References

1908 births
1985 deaths
New Zealand trade unionists
New Zealand military personnel of World War II
Auckland City Councillors
New Zealand Labour Party politicians
Democratic Labour Party (New Zealand) politicians
Unsuccessful candidates in the 1943 New Zealand general election
Unsuccessful candidates in the 1949 New Zealand general election
Unsuccessful candidates in the 1951 New Zealand general election
Unsuccessful candidates in the 1954 New Zealand general election
20th-century New Zealand politicians
Royal New Zealand Air Force personnel
New Zealand justices of the peace